Anthony "Tony" Peter John Trinci (1936, Swindon – 7 October 2020) was a British mycologist, botanist, and microbiologist. He was a leading expert on fungi.

Early life and education
Anthony P. J. Trinci's parents, both born in Italy, had a troubled marriage and separated before his birth, which occurred after his mother immigrated to England. His father, a builder, lived in Italy, and Anthony Trinci reached the age of 11 before he saw his father. Anthony Trinci grew up in Barking, London. During WW II, a V-1 flying bomb passed through his bedroom (while he was absent), brought down the ceiling, but failed to explode until it landed about 100 yards down the road and killed several people.

Educated at St Bonaventure's Catholic School, Trinci studied botany at Durham University (1959). He was a member of St Cuthbert's Society. He stayed on to complete a MSc, where his research focus was fungal physiology. 

Trinci was a science teacher in Rayleigh, Essex for a period of time but soon grew bored and returned to Durham for Ph.D. studies.  He completed his Ph.D. with Geoffrey Howard Banbury (1920–1983) as his thesis advisor. Trinci's thesis is entitled Studies of the growth and tropisms of Aspergillus giganteus and other fungi.

Career
In 1964 Trinci was appointed to a lectureship in the microbiology department of Queen Elizabeth College (QEC). At QEC he did research on fungal growth kinetics and physiology. He developed new methods involving time-lapse photography that enabled "direct observation of colony growth and organisation of the mycelium by hyphal tip growth and branch initiation".

He resigned from QEC to accept in 1981 an appointment as chair of cryptogamic botany at the University of Manchester. There he contributed to the development of the first integrated school of biological sciences. This innovation was subsequently adopted in most of the UK's universities. At the University of Manchester he became a dean and then pro-vice-chancellor.

Trinchi's knowledge of mycology was applied to commercial applications of filamentous fungi. He made substantial contributions to the development of Quorn and to Dupont's addition of fungal enzymes to commercial animal feed. His work with DuPont was the outcome of a decades-long collaboration with Michael K. Theodorou, a rumen microbiologist. Their collaboration elucidated the life cycles of anaerobic fungi   in the gastrointestinal tracts of large, mammalian herbivores. A phytase enzyme, isolated from Penicillium species, is useful in releasing phosphate in animal feeds.

Trinci was the president of the British Mycological Society for the academic year 1991–1992 and was elected the president of the Microbiology Society in 1994. He was awarded the Marjory Stephenson Prize in 1994. He was an editor of the Journal of General Biology (renamed in 1994 Microbiology) for four years beginning in 1990.

He supported David Denning's creation of the University of Manchester's Manchester Fungal Infections Group, an international centre for fungal infection biology. Trinci was a trustee of the Fungal Infection Institute from September 2006 to January 2011.

Personal
In January 1961 he married Margaret Doherty, whom he met at Durham University. Upon his death in 2020 he was survived by his widow, their three children, John, Sarah and Rachel, seven grandchildren and two great-grandchildren.

Selected publications

Articles
 
 
 
 
 
 
 
 
 
 
 
 
 
 
 
  (Note: The article is presented in both English and Spanish; Trinci's name is published aa "Tony Trinci".)

Books

References

External links
 

1936 births
2020 deaths
British mycologists
British microbiologists
People educated at St Bonaventure's Catholic School
Academics of Queen Elizabeth College
Academics of the University of Manchester
Presidents of the British Mycological Society
Alumni of St Cuthbert's Society, Durham
English people of Italian descent